The Brahui, Brahvi or Brohi, are a Dravidian ethnic group of pastoralists principally found in the central region of Balochistan, Pakistan. A minority speaks the Brahui language, which belongs to the Dravidian language family, while the rest speaks Balochi and tend to identify as Baloch. The Brahuis are almost entirely Sunni Muslims.

Etymology
Joseph Elfenbein, asserts that the word "Brahui" derives from Saraiki brāhō, itself a borrowing into Saraiki of the name of the Muslim prophet Ibrahim, and that it most likely only became the native endonym of the Brahui after the Brahui migrated into Sindh and became Muslims,  years ago.

Location 
Their main area of habitation, including the main area where Brahui is spoken, is situated in a continuous area over a narrow north–south belt in Pakistan from the northern fringes of Quetta southwards through Mastung and Kalat, including Nushki to the west, all the way to Las Bela in the south, near the Arabian Sea coastline. Kalat separates the area into a northern part, known as Sarawan, and a southern part, known as Jahlawan.

Large numbers of nomadic and semi-nomadic Brahui speakers are also found in Afghanistan, from the Shorawak desert to the northwest of Nushki in Pakistan in an area extending west along the Helmand River into Sistan, Iran. In Iran, no Brahui speakers are found to the south of Sistan, even though George Passman Tate mentioned a few Brahui's in 1909 as far south as Khash, Iran who were already assimilating into the neighboring Baloch people.

Some Brahui are also found in Turkmenistan, mainly in Merv. Most of these Turkmenistani Brahuis are descendants of the Brahui who migrated together with the Baloch from British administered Balochistan and Afghanistan in the late 19th and early 20th centuries.

Population
The only census that ever recorded the Brahui was conducted in British India. Even then the numbers are marred by confusion between "Brahui tribesmen" and "Brahui speaker". As most Brahui have described themselves as Baloch for centuries to outsiders, this has led to confusion. In Afghanistan and Iran, the Brahui are considered to be ethnically the same as the Baloch people. Ethnologue'''s latest estimate of 2.4 million Brahui speakers is likely an exaggerated count suffering from such issues. Elfenbein, referencing estimations from 1996, notes that there are  Brahui tribesmen, scattered across Pakistani Balochistan and Afghanistan.

Origins
The origins of Brahuis remain unclear and their presence in the area cannot be traced to before the sixteenth century. Emeneau (2007) writes, "The history of the Brahui emerges from total darkness with the displacement of a shadowy Hindu dynasty in Kalat called Sewa by the Mirwani Brahuis."

The fact that other Dravidian languages only exist further south in India leads to the hypothesis that the Brahuis are either a relict population of Dravidians remaining from a time when Dravidians were more widespread or that they migrated to Balochistan from South India at sometime in the last two millennia. Noting extensive phonological similarities with Malto and Kurukh, spoken in East India, Bhadriraju Krishnamurti speculates that the three groups might have had a common stage before migrating to different directions. In their oral traditions, both Kurukhs and Maltos speak of an eastward migration from Karnataka; Brahuis do as well but from Syria, which can be interpreted to be the Islamization of a migratory origin.

However, the Brahuis do not have any significant genetic component matching those of India's Dravidian speakers, and are largely indistinguishable from surrounding Indo-European speakers (Balochi, Makrani, and Pashtuns) — this suggests a passage of sufficient time since any admixture event thereby supporting the relic hypothesis.

Tribes

There are three groups of Brahui tribes, aligned with geographic location.

Currently, the so-called Brahui nation comprises 27 tribes, of which 8 are referred to as nuclear tribes, and 19 are peripheral. Significant majority of Brahuis is related to peripheral tribes. Representatives of only two nuclear tribes speak Brahui as a primary language. The "nucleus" consists of the Achmadzai, Gurguari, Iltazai, Kalandari, Kambrani, Mirwari, Rodeni and the Sumalari, but they account for only a small proportion of the total number of Brahuis. The majority is divided up between the Jhalawan Brahuis (which include the tribes of the Bizanjars, Harunis, Muhammad Hasnis, Mengals, Nicharis, Pandranis, Sajdis and the Zahris), Rahmatzai and the Sarawan Brahuis (comprising the tribes of the Bangulzai, Kūrd, Lahri, Langav, Muhammad-Shahi, Raisani, Rustamzai, Sarparah, Satakzai, Shahwani and Zagar-Mengal).

Language and literacy
According to Elfenbein, about 15% of the Brahui tribesmen are estimated to be primary speakers of the Brahui language. Half of the rest may be secondary speakers of Brahui with Balochi as the primary language, while the other half are estimated to speak no Brahui "at all".

The Brahui language belongs to the Dravidian language family, while Balochi is an Iranian language. Brahui has extensively borrowed from Sindhi and other languages of the area (Indo-Aryan as well as Iranian); McAlpin (2015) found the language to be an "etymological nightmare". Brahui has three dialects with no significant variation among them: Sarawani (spoken in the north), Jhalawani (spoken in the southeast), and Chaghi (spoken in the northwest and west). It does not have any standard script and there does not appear to exist any significant corpus of literature either; literacy rates among Brahuis remained very low as late as 1990s.

See also
 Stocksia brahuica , a flowering plant belonging to the family Sapindaceae, named after the Brahui people.
 Pancha-Dravida

References

 Naseer Dashti The Baloch and Balochistan A historical account from the Beginning to the fall of the Baloch State''  (sc)

Bibliography

 
Ethnic groups in Afghanistan
Ethnic groups in Pakistan
Indigenous peoples of South Asia
Social groups of Balochistan, Pakistan